Primary care trusts were abolished on 31 March 2013 as part of the Health and Social Care Act 2012, with their commissioning work taken over by clinical commissioning groups.  Their public health role was transferred to local authorities and to Public Health England.  Their community service provision was distributed in various ways, some to community health trusts. This list is of the PCTs which existed in 2012.

History
In October 2006, all primary care trusts (PCTs) outside the London area were restructured.  This reduced the number of PCTs from 303 to 152. At the same time, the number of  strategic health authorities (SHAs) (which have responsibility for the PCTs) were also decreased (from 28 to 10). These ten new SHAs largely mimic the geography of the government office regions. The exception to this was the South East Government Office Region which is covered by two strategic health authorities: South Central SHA and South East Cost SHA.

The PCTs were organised into clusters so as to achieve management cost savings, although the PCTs themselves remained separate statutory bodies. Whilst the majority of clusters contained multiple PCTs, there were some clusters, such as Cumbria, which consisted of just a single primary care trust. In October 2011, the ten SHAs were also grouped into clusters, with each having its own executive team, chief executive, and directors. There were four SHA clusters, and these were London, North of England, NHS Midlands and East, and South of England.

As a result of the Health and Social Care Act 2012, all PCTs and SHAs were abolished on 31 March 2013, and replaced by clinical commissioning groups taking over the function of commissioning health and care services.

London 
NHS London was the strategic health authority for the capital, with responsibility for 31 PCTs which operated in five clusters. The PCTs were coterminous with London borough boundaries.

NHS North East London and the City 

In April 2012, North East London and the City was created from the merger of two previous PCT clusters; NHS East London and the City, and NHS Outer North East London.

 Barking and Dagenham PCT
 Havering PCT
 Redbridge PCT
 Waltham Forest PCT
 City and Hackney Teaching PCT
 Newham PCT
 Tower Hamlets PCT

North Central London  

 NHS Barnet
 Camden PCT
 Enfield PCT
 Haringey Teaching PCT
 Islington PCT

North West London 

 Brent Teaching PCT
 Ealing PCT
 NHS Hammersmith and Fulham
 Kensington and Chelsea PCT
 Harrow PCT
 Hillingdon PCT
 NHS Hounslow
 Westminster PCT

South West London  

 NHS Croydon - Croydon Primary Care Trust
 Kingston PCT
 Sutton and Merton PCT
 Richmond and Twickenham PCT
 Wandsworth PCT

South East London 

 Bexley Care Trust
 Bromley PCT
 Greenwich Teaching PCT
 Lambeth PCT
 Lewisham PCT
 Southwark PCT

North of England 
The North of England SHA cluster was made up of three strategic health authorities; NHS Yorkshire and the Humber, NHS North West and NHS North East.

NHS North East

NHS North East consisted of 12 PCTs organised into 4 clusters.

County Durham and Darlington
 County Durham PCT – Created by a merger of five primarycCaretTrusts in 2006. These PCTs were: Derwentside, Durham and Chester-le-Street, Durham Dales, Easington and Sedgefield PCTs.
 Darlington PCT

North of Tyne
 Newcastle PCT
 North Tyneside PCT
 Northumberland Care Trust

South of Tyne and Wear
 Gateshead PCT
 South Tyneside PCT
 Sunderland Teaching PCT

Tees
 NHS Hartlepool
 NHS Middlesbrough
 NHS Redcar and Cleveland
 NHS Stockton-on-Tees

NHS North West 

NHS North West consisted of 24 PCTs organised into 5 PCT clusters.

Cheshire, Warrington and Wirral 
 Central and Eastern Cheshire PCT
 Warrington PCT
 Western Cheshire PCT
 Wirral PCT - Formed on 1 October 2006 from the merger of Birkenhead & Wallasey PCT, and Bebington & West Wirral PCT

Cumbria 
 Cumbria PCT

Greater Manchester 
 NHS Ashton, Leigh and Wigan
 Bolton PCT
 Bury PCT
 Heywood, Middleton and Rochdale PCT
 Manchester PCT (Merged from Manchester North, South and Central PCTs)
 NHS Oldham
 Salford PCT
 Stockport PCT
 Tameside and Glossop PCT - This PCT reported to the North West SHA, though part it (Glossop) fell geographically within the East Midlands SHA
 Trafford PCT

Lancashire 
 Blackburn with Darwen PCT
 Blackpool PCT
 Central Lancashire PCT - Formed on 1 October 2006 from the merger of Chorley and South Ribble PCT, Preston PCT, and West Lancashire PCT
 East Lancashire Teaching PCT
 North Lancashire PCT - Formed on 1 October 2006 from the merger of Fylde PCT, Wyre PCT, and half of Morecambe Bay PCT

Merseyside 
 Halton and St Helens PCT
 Liverpool PCT
 Sefton PCT
 Knowsley PCT

NHS Yorkshire and the Humber 
NHS Yorkshire and the Humber SHA was formed in 2006 from the merger of the three former SHAa of West Yorkshire, South Yorkshire, and North and East Yorkshire and Northern Lincolnshire. This SHA contained 15 PCTs organised into 6 clusters.

Calderdale, Kirklees and Wakefield 
 Calderdale PCT
 NHS Kirklees (when created?)
 NHS Wakefield District

The Humber 
 NHS Hull
 North East Lincolnshire Care Trust Plus
 East Riding of Yorkshire
 North Lincolnshire PCT

South Yorkshire and Bassetlaw 
 Barnsley PCT
 Bassetlaw PCT - until 2011 Bassetlaw PCT was under the East Midlands SHA. However, when PCTs were formed into clusters, it was transferred to the South Yorkshire cluster.
 Doncaster PCT (from the merger of Doncaster Central PCT, Doncaster East PCT, Doncaster West PCT on 1 October 2006)
 NHS Rotherham
 NHS Sheffield (from the merger of North Sheffield PCT, Sheffield South West PCT, Sheffield West PCT, Sheffield South East PCT on 1 October 2006)

Bradford 
 Bradford and Airedale Teaching Primary Care Trust

Leeds 
 NHS Leeds

North Yorkshire and York 
 NHS North Yorkshire and York

NHS Midlands and East 
This SHA cluster was constituted into three strategic health authorities; NHS East of England, NHS East Midlands, and NHS West Midlands.

NHS East Midlands 
This strategic health authority had responsibility for nine PCTs, arranged into five clusters.

Derbyshire County and Derby City 
 Derby City PCT - Formed from the merger of Central Derby PCT and Greater Derby PCT
 Derbyshire County PCT - Formed on 1 October 2006 from the merger of High Peak and Dales PCT, Erewash PCT, Derbyshire Dales and South Derbyshire PCT, North Eastern Derbyshire PCT, Amber Valley PCT and Chesterfield PCT

Leicestershire County and Rutland and Leicestershire City 
 Leicester City PCT - Formed from the merger of Eastern Leicester PCT and Leicester City West PCT
 Leicestershire County and Rutland PCT - Formed from the merger of Charnwood & North West Leicestershire PCT, Hinckley and Bosworth PCT, Melton, Rutland & Harborough PCT, and South Leicestershire PCT

Lincolnshire 
 NHS Lincolnshire - Formed from the merger of East Lincolnshire PCT, Lincolnshire South West Teaching PCT and West Lincolnshire PCT

Northamptonshire and Milton Keynes 
 Northamptonshire Teaching PCT - Formed from the merger of Daventry and South Northamptonshire PCT, Northampton Teaching PCT and Northamptonshire Heartlands PCT
 Milton Keynes PCT - Became part of the East Midlands SHA in April 2011.

Nottinghamshire County and Nottingham City 
 Nottingham City PCT
 Nottinghamshire County Teaching PCT - Formed from the merger of Ashfield PCT, Broxtowe and Hucknall PCT, Gedling PCT, Mansfield District PCT, Newark and Sherwood PCT, and Rushcliffe PCT [7]

East of England 
The Bedfordshire & Hertfordshire; Norfolk, Suffolk & Cambridgeshire; and Essex strategic health authorities were merged in July 2006 to make the East of England SHA.

Hertfordshire 
 NHS Hertfordshire

Bedfordshire and Luton 
 NHS Luton
 NHS Bedfordshire
 North Essex
 West Essex PCT
 North East Essex PCT
 Mid-Essex PCT

South Essex 
 South East Essex PCT
 South West Essex PCT

Cambridgeshire and Peterborough 
 Cambridgeshire PCT
 Peterborough PCT

Norfolk and Waveney 
 Norfolk PCT
 Great Yarmouth and Waveney PCT

Suffolk 
 Suffolk PCT

West Midlands 
NHS West Midlands (otherwise known as the West Midlands Strategic Health Authority) was formed on 1 July 2006 from Birmingham and the Black Country SHA, Shropshire and Staffordshire SHA, and West Midlands South SHA). It consisted of five PCT clusters.

Arden 
 Coventry Teaching PCT
 Warwickshire PCT - formed on 1 October 2006 following merger of North Warwickshire PCT, Rugby PCT and South Warwickshire PCT)

Birmingham and Solihull 
 NHS Birmingham East and North (also known as Birmingham East and North Primary Care Trust, and formed on 1 October 2006 following merger of Eastern Birmingham PCT and North Birmingham PCT)
 Heart of Birmingham Teaching PCT
 Solihull Care Trust (Solihull Adult Social services joined Solihull PCT to create a new organisation Solihull Care Trust)
 South Birmingham PCT

Black Country 
 Dudley PCT (formed on 1 October 2006 following merger of Dudley Beacon & Castle PCT and Dudley South PCT)
 Sandwell PCT (formed on 1 October 2006 following merger of Oldbury & Smethwick PCT, Rowley Regis & Tipton PCT and Wednesbury & West Bromwich PCT)
 Walsall Teaching PCT
 Wolverhampton City PCT

Staffordshire 
 Stoke-on-Trent PCT
 South Staffordshire PCT
 NHS North Staffordshire (North Staffordshire PCT - formed on 1 October 2006 following merger of Newcastle-under-Lyme PCT and Staffordshire Moorlands PCT)

West Mercia 
 Herefordshire PCT
 NHS Telford and Wrekin (Telford and Wrekin PCT)
 Shropshire County PCT
 Worcestershire PCT (formed on 1 October 2006 following merger of Redditch and Bromsgrove PCT, South Worcestershire PCT and Wyre Forest PCT)

NHS South of England 
The NHS South of England SHA comprised South Central, South East Coast and South West strategic health authorities.

South Central Strategic Health Authority 

This SHA consisted of eight PCTs organised into three separate clusters.

NHS Berkshire Cluster 
 NHS Berkshire West
 NHS Berkshire East

NHS Southampton, Hampshire, Isle of Wight and Portsmouth 
 NHS Southampton City
 NHS Hampshire
 NHS Isle of Wight
 NHS Portsmouth

NHS Oxfordshire and Buckinghamshire 
 NHS Buckinghamshire
 NHS Oxfordshire

South East Coast

Kent and Medway 
 NHS Eastern and Coastal Kent
 NHS West Kent
 NHS Medway

Surrey 
 Surrey PCT

Sussex 
 Brighton and Hove City PCT
 East Sussex Downs and Weald PCT (made by merger of Eastbourne Downs PCT and Sussex Downs and Weald PCT)
 Hastings and Rother PCT (made by merger of Hastings and St Leonards PCT and Bexhill and Rother PCT)
 West Sussex PCT (made by merger of Adur, Arun and Worthing PCT, Western Sussex PCT, Horsham and Chanctonbury PCT, Crawley PCT, and Mid-Sussex PCT)
 Wycombe PCT

NHS South West 

NHS South West (South West SHA) was formed from the merger of Avon, Gloucestershire and Wiltshire SHA, Dorset and Somerset SHA and South West Peninsula SHA. It consisted of 7 PCT clusters containing 14 PCTs.

Bath, North East Somerset, Wiltshire 
 Bath & North East Somerset PCT
 Wiltshire PCT

Bournemouth, Poole, Dorset 
 Dorset PCT
 Bournemouth & Poole Teaching PCT

Bristol, North Somerset, South Gloucestershire 
 Bristol Teaching PCT
 North Somerset PCT
 South Gloucestershire PCT

Cornwall and Isles of Scilly 
 Cornwall & Isles of Scilly PCT

Devon, Plymouth, Torbay Care Trust 
 Devon PCT
 Plymouth Teaching PCT (also known as NHS Plymouth)
 Torbay Care Trust

Gloucestershire, Swindon 
 Gloucestershire PCT
 Swindon PCT

Somerset 
 Somerset PCT

See also
National Health Service (England)
NHS trust
Strategic health authority
NHS primary care trust

References

Primary Care Trusts in England
Primary Care Trusts
National Health Service (England)
Defunct National Health Service organisations